Roadside may refer to:

Road verge, a strip of greenery between a road and a sidewalk
Shoulder (road), an emergency stopping lane by the verge of a road
Roadside, Caithness, Scotland, a village
Roadside (film), a 2013 American horror film
Roadside (musical), a 2001 off-Broadway musical
Roadside, a 1930 play by Lynn Riggs; basis for the musical
"Roadside", a song by The Game from Born 2 Rap
"Roadside", a song by Rise Against from The Sufferer & the Witness
The Roadside, an EP by Billy Idol

See also
Minffordd (Welsh for "roadside"), a Welsh village
Roadside attraction